Fabio Fognini was the defending champion, but lost to Filip Krajinović in the second round.
Leonardo Mayer won the title, defeating David Ferrer in the final,  6–7(3–7), 6–1, 7–6(7–4).

Seeds
All seeds receive a bye into the second round. 

 David Ferrer (final)
 Fabio Fognini (second round)
 Tommy Robredo (third round)
 Alexandr Dolgopolov (third round)
 Mikhail Youzhny (second round)
 Roberto Bautista Agut (withdrew)
 Philipp Kohlschreiber (semifinals)
 Marcel Granollers (second round)
 Fernando Verdasco (second round)
 Guillermo García López (second round)
 Santiago Giraldo (third round)
 Gilles Simon (third round)
 Federico Delbonis (second round)
 João Sousa (second round)
 Carlos Berlocq (second round)
 Andreas Seppi (second round)

Draw

Finals

Top half

Section 1

Section 2

Bottom half

Section 3

Section 4

Qualifying

Seeds

 Albert Ramos Viñolas (qualified)
 Thomaz Bellucci (qualifying competition, Lucky loser)
 Daniel Gimeno Traver (qualified)
 Diego Sebastián Schwartzman (qualifying competition)
 Andrey Kuznetsov (qualifying competition)
 Facundo Bagnis (qualifying competition)
 Marco Cecchinato (qualifying competition)
 Marsel İlhan (qualified)
 Gerald Melzer (qualifying competition)
 Gastão Elias (qualified)
 Filip Krajinović (qualified)
 Mate Delić (qualified)

Qualifiers

Lucky losers

Qualifying draw

First qualifier

Second qualifier

Third qualifier

Fourth qualifier

Fifth qualifier

Sixth qualifier

References
Main Draw
Qualifying Draw

International German Open - Singles
2014 International German Open